There have been eleven special routes of U.S. Route 36 in the state of Missouri.  All but one of which are or were business routes while the other was a spur route.  Eight of the ten business routes exist today.  The spur route became one of the extant business routes in 1973.

St. Joseph business route

Cameron business route

Hamilton business route

Chillicothe business route

Brookfield business route

Macon business route

Macon spur

Clarence business route

Shelbina business route

Monroe City business route

Hannibal city route

Hannibal business route

U.S. Route 36 Business (Bus. US 36) in the city of Hannibal, Missouri, was a business route that is a loop of US 36.  The business route started at a single-point urban interchange with US 36, the Chicago-Kansas City Expressway, and US 61. The route then turned onto Pleasant Avenue and then St. Marys Avenue. The route then turned east and became Broadway (Street). It went through downtown Hannibal and turned north on Route 79. It then terminated at I-72/US 36/Route 110 (CKC).

See also

References

Special
36
36 Missouri